The picolaton (also known as the pique-au-mollet, quiperlibresson and cacalambri) is an imaginary bird present in the folklore of Franche-Comté.

It is best known as a creature used to threaten lazy children, by saying that the picolaton would nip their heels and buttocks if they did not hurry. It is thus akin to the bogeyman. Particularly irritating children are promised a visit to the incredible nest of the fabulous bird around April Fool's Day, provided they are very good and obedient. It supposedly nests in thorn bushes.

See also
Boogieman

References

French legendary creatures
Legendary birds
Culture of Franche-Comté
Bogeymen